Rebecca Cole, or Bec Cole may refer to:

Beccy Cole, Australian musician
Beck Cole, Australian filmmaker
Rebecca Cole, African-American doctor
Rebecca Cole (basketball), Australian basketball player (also known as Bec)
Rebecca Cole (musician), American musician